Cyathocalyx is a small genus with about 22 species distributed from southern India, Sri Lanka, through Malaysia, Indomalayan islands and reaches as far as Fiji in the South Pacific.

The salient features of the genus includes- monopodial trees, supra-axillary or nearly leaf-opposed inflorescences, six petals which are basally concave and constricted above the reproductive organs to form a "pollination chamber".

The genus consists 22 identified species with two unresolved species.

Species
 Cyathocalyx acuminatus C.B.Rob. peninsular malaysia
 Cyathocalyx annamensis  Ast.
 Cyathocalyx apoensis (Elmer) J.Sinclair
 Cyathocalyx cauliflorus K.Schum. & Lauterb.
 Cyathocalyx crassipetalus R.J.Wang & R.M.K.Saunders
 Cyathocalyx filiformis Ast.
 Cyathocalyx globosus Merr.
 Cyathocalyx hexagynus (Miq.) R.J.Wang & R.M.K.Saunders	
 Cyathocalyx kingii Boerl. ex Koord. Peninsular malaysia
 Cyathocalyx lucidus Diels
Cyathocalyx maingayi Hook. f. & Thomson peninsular malaysia
Cyathocalyx magnifica *peninsular malaysia
 Cyathocalyx magnifructus R.J.Wang & R.M.K.Saunders. malaysia (sbh.srwk)
 Cyathocalyx martabanicus  Hook.f. & Thomson
 Cyathocalyx minahassae Koord.
 Cyathocalyx obtusifolius Becc. & Scheff.
 Cyathocalyx olivaceus (George King (botanist)King) J.Sinclair peninsular malaysia
 Cyathocalyx petiolatus  Diels. Peninsular malaysia
 Cyathocalyx polycarpa C.T.White & W.D.Francis
 Cyathocalyx pubescens Scheff.
 Cyathocalyx samarensis R.J.Wang & R.M.K.Saunders
Cyathocalyx scortechinii  (King) J.Sinclair. peninsular malaysia
 Cyathocalyx sumatranus Scheff.
 Cyathocalyx vitiensis  A.C.Sm.
 Cyathocalyx zeylanicus Champ. ex Hook.f. & Thomson. Peninsular malaysia

Unresolved species
 Cyathocalyx harmandii  (Finet & Gagnep.) R.J.Wang & R.M.K.Saunders
 Cyathocalyx maingayi  Hook.f. & Thomson

References

Annonaceae genera
Annonaceae
Taxa named by Joseph Dalton Hooker